24th Cavalry Division may refer to:
24th Cavalry Division (Soviet Union)
24th Cavalry Division (United States)